In Greek mythology, the name Sthenele (Ancient Greek: Σθενέλη) may refer to:

Sthenele, daughter of Danaus and Memphis, who married (and killed) Sthenelus, son of Aegyptus and Tyria.
Sthenele, daughter of Acastus, King of Iolcus. She was the mother of Patroclus by Menoetius of Opus. Other possible mothers of Patroclus are Polymele, Periopis, Philomela and Damocrateia.

Notes

References 

 Apollodorus, The Library with an English Translation by Sir James George Frazer, F.B.A., F.R.S. in 2 Volumes, Cambridge, MA, Harvard University Press; London, William Heinemann Ltd. 1921. ISBN 0-674-99135-4. Online version at the Perseus Digital Library. Greek text available from the same website.
Gaius Julius Hyginus, Fabulae from The Myths of Hyginus translated and edited by Mary Grant. University of Kansas Publications in Humanistic Studies. Online version at the Topos Text Project.
Tzetzes, John, Allegories of the Iliad translated by Goldwyn, Adam J. and Kokkini, Dimitra. Dumbarton Oaks Medieval Library, Harvard University Press, 2015. 

Princesses in Greek mythology
Danaids
Characters from Iolcus
Locrian mythology